Mario Vegetti (4 January 1937 – 11 March 2018) was an Italian historian of philosophy.

Education
Mario Vegetti was born in Milan in 1937. He graduated with a thesis on Thucydides' historiography at the University of Pavia, as a student at Collegio Ghislieri. 

He was full professor of the history of ancient philosophy at the University of Pavia and directed the Department of Philosophy of the same university. He was professor at Scuola Superiore Studi Pavia IUSS.

He was a member of the International Collegium Politicum, of the Accademia napoletana di scienze morali, and of the Istituto Lombardo-Accademia di Scienze e Lettere.

Research interests
He translated and wrote a commentary of many of Hippocrates', Aristoteles', and Galen's writings. Among Vegetti's are  Il coltello e lo stilo (1996), Tra Edipo e Euclide (1983), L'etica degli antichi (1996), Guida alla lettura della 'Repubblica' di Platone (1999), Quindici lezioni su Platone (2003). 

Vegetti's research work covered several fields of history of ancient thought such as: ethics, politics, anthropology, history of medicine and science, and philosophical historiography.
Some of his papers are devoted to topics concerning the forms of subjectivity, anthropological theories, and the formation of the concept of cause, other studies deal with Plato, Aristotle, Stoicism, Hellenistic Medicine, and Galen.

External links
L'etica e la filosofia antica
La retorica e la persuasione
La medicina greca. Aristotele. I pitagorici. Socrate.
L'etica in Platone e Aristotele

1937 births
2018 deaths
Italian philosophers
People from Milan